Anil Dhawan  is an Indian actor who appears in Hindi films and television. He made his acting debut with the film Chetna (1970) followed by Piya Ka Ghar (1971). He is also known for his 2018 film Andhadhun.

Now turned activist, Dhawan was part of Anna Hazare camp in his crusade against corruption in Indian public life.

Early life
Dhawan belongs to Kanpur, Uttar Pradesh, India. His father, Madan Lal Dhawan, was AGM in UCO Bank, who came to India from Peshawar, Pakistan in around 1947. Anil did his high school from St. Francis Xavier's School, Kanpur and graduated from Christ Church College, Kanpur. He later obtained a diploma in acting from Film and Television Institute of India, Pune in the same batch as Jaya Bhaduri. His son is actor Siddharth Dhawan. Director David Dhawan is his brother, another director Rohit Dhawan and actor Varun Dhawan are his nephews. Anil Dhawan has one granddaughter Anjini from his son Siddharth.

Career
He joined Film and Television Institute of India as he wanted to become an actor . He entered Bollywood in the '70s. His first film was B. R. Ishara's Chetna (1970). He worked with rising actor Aditya Pancholi in the television movie Sone Ka Pinjra (1986). Actress/director Asha Parekh directed him in the television serial,  Kora Kagaz in the 1990s. He was junior to actor Navin Nischol in FTII. He is noted for the song "Yeh Jeevan Hai" in the film Piya Ka Ghar (1971) with actress Jaya Bhaduri. The music was composed by Laxmikant-Pyarelal and sung by Kishore Kumar. 

In 2011, Anil Dhawan secured pivotal role in Main Lakshmi Tere Aangan Ki on Life OK, starring opposite Aruna Irani.

On his adoration of actress/director Asha Parekh, who directed him in the television serial Kora Kogaz in the 1990s: "I have been a great fan of hers. When I joined the industry in the '70s, she was doing her last film as a heroine, Heera (1973). I would hop over to wherever she would be shooting and gawk at her."

He is also working as an actor in the TV Serial Roop - Mard Ka Naya Swaroop on Colors TV Channel.

Filmography

Films

Munimji (1972)
Tanhaai (1972)
Haar Jeet (1972)
Anokha Daan (1972)
Annadata (1972)
Yauwan (1973)
Samjhauta (1973)
Rani Aur Jaani (1973)
Honeymoon (1973)
Ghulam Begam Badshah (1973)
Loafer (1973)
Hawas (1974)
Ek Hans Ka Jora (1975)
Sikka (1976)
Nagin (1976)
Zindagi (1976)
Durgavahini (1976) As Chethan Perera
Took Ka Badboo (1976) As Amit
Saheb Bahadur (1977)
Lal Kothi (1978)
Ghata (1978)
Darwaza (1978)
Beqasoor (1980 film)
Oh Bewafa (1980)
Mahfil (1981)
Saajan Ki Saheli (1981)
Do Posti (1981)
Maut Ka Saya (1982)
Raakh aur Chingari (1982)
Chandani Bani Chudel (1984)
Sone Ka Pinjra (1986) (TV)
Avinash (1986)
Mere Baad (1988) Rakesh Malhotra
Taaqatwar (1989)
Purani Haveli (1989)
Daata (1989)
Gola Barood (1989)
Parchhaeen (1989)
Trikon (1990) (TV)
Khatarnaak (1990)
Karishma Kali Kaa (1990)
Aandhiyan (1990)
Teri Talash Mein (1990)
Mast Kalandar (1991)
Khooni Panja (1991)
Ajooba Kudrat Ka (1991)
Khoon Ka Karz (1991)
Aakhri Cheekh (1991)
House No. 13 (1991)
Mehboob Mere Mehboob (1992)
Insaan Bana Shaitan (1992)
Muskurahat (1992)
Geet (1992)
Yuhi Kabhi (1994)
Khuddar (1994)
Ekka Raja Rani (1994)
Gangster (1994)
Teesra Kaun? (1994)
Sarhad: The Border of Crime (1995)
Yaraana (1995)
Laalchee (1996)
Loafer (1996)
Daadagiri (1997)
Bhayaanak Panja (1997)
Hero No. 1 (1997)
Chudail (1997)
Do Ankhen Barah Hath (1997)
Tarazu (1997)
Mr. and Mrs. Khiladi (1997)
Hitler (1998)
Laash (1998)
Hatyara (1998)
Hogi Pyaar Ki Jeet (1999)
Hote Hote Pyar Ho Gaya (1999)
Haseena Maan Jaayegi (1999)
Khooni Shikanja (2000)
Papa the Great (2000)
Chal Mere Bhai (2000)
Jodi No.1 (2001)
Waah! Tera Kya Kehna (2002)
Shikaar (2004)
Ho Jaata Hai Pyaar (2005)
Kyon Ki... (2005)
Jahan Jaaeyega Hamen Paaeyega (2007)
Sanam Hum Aapke Hain (2009)
U R My Jaan (2011)
Rascals (2011)
Himmatwala (2013)
Andhadhun (2018)
Coolie No. 1 (2020) - as Mahendra Pratap Singh
Shiddat (2021)

Television

 Parampara (1993–1998) as Ashok Malhotra
 Toofan (1999) as Rahmat Khan
 Kkusum (2003) as Raman Kanwar
 Tum Bin Jaaoon Kahaan (2003–2005) as Avinash Mathur
 Humsafar : The Train (2007) as  Subhash Kapoor Shivani 's Father
 Main Lakshmi Tere Aangan Ki (2011–2012) as Lakshmi's father
 Pyaar Ka Dard Hai Meetha Meetha Pyaara Pyaara (2013) as Manik Deewan
 Bhagyalaxmi (2015) as Murlimohan Shukla
 Roop - Mard Ka Naya Swaroop (2018) as Avinash Dixit
 Sirf Tum (2021–2022) as Devendra Oberoi

References

External links
 
 Anil Dhawan Profile on Cinespot

Indian male film actors
Indian male television actors
Living people
People from Delhi
Film and Television Institute of India alumni
Male actors in Hindi cinema
20th-century Indian male actors
21st-century Indian male actors
1935 births